Beloki is a Basque surname. Notable people with the surname include:

Joseba Beloki (born 1973), Spanish former professional road bicycle racer
Rubén Beloki (born 1974), Basque pelota player, known as Beloki I
Alberto Beloki (born 1978), Basque pelota player, known as Beloki II

Basque-language surnames